Looney Tunes Platinum Collection: Volume 3 is a Blu-ray and DVD release by Warner Home Video. It contains 50 Looney Tunes and Merrie Melodies cartoons and numerous supplements. It was released on Blu-ray on August 12, 2014, and was released on DVD on November 4, 2014.

According to Jerry Beck on the Stu's Show from early 2013–2014, he said it will probably be the last volume of the series due to the low sales of the second volume in 2012 and no remastering budget for Warner Bros. to remaster shorts previously unreleased on DVD and Blu-ray. Only 4 cartoons are new to disc. This is the first and only volume where the Blu-ray only has two discs. Included is a 12-page booklet similar to what came with Volume 2.

Disc 1

Special features
Audio Commentaries
Michael Barrier on Bully for Bugs, Slick Hare, A Corny Concerto, A Bear for Punishment, Hillbilly Hare
Greg Ford on High Diving Hare
Michael Barrier and Greg Ford on Hair-Raising Hare
Bill Melendez on The Big Snooze
Jerry Beck on Gorilla My Dreams
Jerry Beck and June Foray on Honey's Money
John Kricfalusi and Bill Melendez on Falling Hare
Daniel Goldmark on Pigs in a Polka
Paul Dini on Operation: Rabbit 
Music and effects track on Operation: Rabbit, Bunny Hugged, Hillbilly Hare, A Bear for Punishment
Behind the Tunes:
 "Bugs Bunny: Ain't He a Stinker?" (The Essential Bugs Bunny)
 "The Art of the Gag" (Golden Collection Volume 4)
 "Drawn to Life: The Art of Robert McKimson" (Golden Collection Volume 5)
 "Wild Lines: The Art of Voice Acting" (Golden Collection Volume 4)
Documentaries:
 "That's All Folks! Tales From Termite Terrace" (New)
 "Irreverent Imagination: The Golden Age of Looney Tunes" (Golden Collection Volume 1)
 "Drawn For Glory: Animation's Triumph at the Oscars" (Academy Award Collection)
Storyboard reel for Hair-Raising Hare.

Disc 2

Special features
Audio Commentaries
Jerry Beck on Canary Row and Walky Talky Hawky
Joe Dante on Porky Pig's Feat
Eddie Fitzgerald and John Kricfalusi on Draftee Daffy
Daniel Goldmark on Swooner Crooner and Wholly Smoke
Jerry Beck and Art Leonardi on Birds Anonymous
John Kricfalusi on A Gruesome Twosome
Milton Gray on A Gruesome Twosome
Greg Ford on Plane Daffy and Scrap Happy Daffy
Eddie Fitzgerald on The Stupid Cupid
Michael Barrier on Walky Talky Hawky
Music-Only Tracks on Guided Muscle, Birds Anonymous, Satan's Waitin', and Nelly's Folly
Behind the Tunes:
 "Daffy Duck: Ridicule is the Burden of Genius" (The Essential Daffy Duck)
 "Unsung Maestros: A Directors Tribute" (Golden Collection Volume 5)
 "Tish Tash: The Animated World of Frank Tashlin" (Golden Collection Volume 3)
 "Strictly For the Birds: Tweety & Sylvester's Award-Winning Team-up" (Golden Collection Volume 3)
Documentaries:
 "Mel Blanc: The Man of a Thousand Voices" (Golden Collection Volume 6)
 "The Boys From Termite Terrace" (Golden Collection Volume 1)
Frank Tashlin's Storybooks:
 "Little Chic's Wonderful Mother" (Golden Collection Volume 4)
"Tony and Clarence" (Golden Collection Volume 4)

See also
 Looney Tunes Golden Collection
 Looney Tunes and Merrie Melodies filmography
 Looney Tunes and Merrie Melodies filmography (1929–1939)
 Looney Tunes and Merrie Melodies filmography (1940–1949)
 Looney Tunes and Merrie Melodies filmography (1950–1959)
 Looney Tunes and Merrie Melodies filmography (1960–1969)
 Looney Tunes and Merrie Melodies filmography (1970–present and miscellaneous)

Notes

References

Looney Tunes home video releases